Carlos Fernando Olsen (born 27 December 1994) is an Argentine professional footballer who plays as a midfielder for Defensores Unidos.

Career
Olsen spent the early years of his senior career in Torneo Argentino B with UOCRA and Atlético Pilar Obrero, netting once in eight games for the former before appearing four times for the latter. The two clubs notably merged midway through the two stints, with Olsen the only UOCRA player to be signed over. In June 2018, having featured for Zárate's Belgrano from 2016, Olsen joined Defensores Unidos of Primera B Metropolitana. He made his bow for the club on 19 August versus UAI Urquiza, which preceded his first goal arriving away to Deportivo Español in the succeeding November.

Career statistics
.

References

External links

1994 births
Living people
Place of birth missing (living people)
Argentine footballers
Association football midfielders
Torneo Argentino B players
Primera B Metropolitana players
Defensores Unidos footballers
21st-century Argentine people